Munin Saiprasart (Nickname: May), is a professional cartoonist which is renowned in the comic industry in Thailand. Her first comic's name is Munin, from the "Jumaao" publisher. The response from this comic is absolutely brilliant. Aside from this, she is the one who draws the cartoon in the music video named “Ratreesawat” (Goodnight), which is the story about the soldier in the three southern provinces of Thailand.

Biography 
Saiprasart was born on April 12, 1988, in Khon Kaen province. She graduated from the Faculty of Architecture, Khon Kaen University, and got first honored gold medal. The thing that sparks Munin to be a cartoonist started when she sent her drawing to many competitions. She also received many prizes and awards then. While she was studying in kindergarten and primary school, she used to draw the cartoon pattern that was copied from the famous comics in that period. Later, when she was in high school, she liked to draw Japanese cartoons so much that she developed much of her drawing skill. Munin used her friend as a character to draw her cartoon. Many people admired her skill in drawing; she then published her work via YouTube and social network sites. Jumaao publisher saw her talent and invited her to write a comic. At present, she is the owner of 10 Millimeter which launched with the picture story named “Taeng-Aeng”, and “Prayoke-Sunyaluk”.

The story of Munin’s comic 
"Munin" is a comic that delivers the story of love in different aspect. For instance,
"Rak-Lek" – a comic about the result from excessive self-confident which finally ended up as a love at one side.
"Mhar-Me-Pun-Ha" – a comic is about a couple that buy a dog named Boran, until lately the dog feels curious about the changes in his owner's happiness.
"Nong-Kon-Lek" –a story is about three brothers who like different toys, but finally bring those toys to play together.
"Krung-Sood-Tye" – a story about a boy who studied the entire level of education, while being pressured by his family. However, this boy has his own attitude toward education in a different aspect from his family.
i Sea U - In 2012, Munin drew a comic series called “I Sea You”. This comic series is very popular among young teenager.  I sea you is a photo book that has a story about boy and girl. This book has content about philosophy of love which attracted most of the young girl. I Sea You is a story telling comic that attached love quotes into every single page. Also, I Sea You is a quote book that has an illustration of cartoon. I Sea You become famous because it's easy to read and the cartoon is very cute.

Individual work 
munin 1-6 (link)
Good Thursday
Gray scale
I sea u
Lovely man
Story and picture
Pencil
Self-made
Symbol sentence
A producer of music video “Goodnight” YouTube

Cooperative work 
Love “gray road”
Anything is funny
Onion “hear of disabled”
Done Project “Number 23 tree of a boy”
LET's Comic

I Sea You 
In 2012, Saiprasart drew a comic series called “I Sea You”. This comic series is very popular among young teenagers.  I Sea You is a photo book that has a story about boy and girl. This book has content about philosophy of love which attracted most of the young girls. I Sea You is a story telling comic that attached love quotes into every single page. Also, I Sea You is a quote book that has an illustration of cartoons. I Sea You became famous because it is easy to read and the cartoon is very cute.

References

Munin Saiprasart
1988 births
Living people